"thirties" can refer to:

 1930s
 2030s